CFNB-FM is a Canadian radio station that broadcasts a community radio format at 97.5 FM in D'arcy, British Columbia. The station is owned and operated by the Anderson Lake Recreational and Cultural Society.

The CFNB call sign was used at a former radio station in Fredericton, New Brunswick, until 1996 when the station moved to the FM band known today as CIBX-FM.

External links
CFNB 97.5
 

Fnb
Fnb
Year of establishment missing